Trinidad and Tobago competed at the 1984 Summer Paralympics in Stoke Mandeville, Great Britain and New York City, United States. 8 competitors from Trinidad and Tobago won 3 medals, 2 gold and 1 bronze and finished 29th in the medal table.

See also 
 Trinidad and Tobago at the Paralympics
 Trinidad and Tobago at the 1984 Summer Olympics

References 

Trinidad and Tobago at the Paralympics
Nations at the 1984 Summer Paralympics